Woodgate Aviation is a British aircraft charter and management company based in Belfast, Northern Ireland, which specialises in medical flights.

Woodgate Aviation operate from a purpose built modern hangar at Belfast International Airport.

References

External links
 Woodgate Aviation

Airlines of the United Kingdom
Companies based in Belfast